Friedenswald is a village that was incorporated in 2008 and ratified by the Camden County, Missouri Commission under the Missouri Village Law. Friedenswald is located in the central part of Camden County, Missouri on Lake Road 5-89. It comprises approximately 65 acres and is governed by a Board of Trustees. The village is one of the smallest in the U.S. having a population of 2.

Demographics

References 

Villages in Camden County, Missouri
Villages in Missouri